Mohamed Karim Sbihi  (born 27 March 1988) is a British rower. He is a three-time Olympian and Olympic medal winner. He won a gold medal in the coxless four at 2016 Rio Olympics, and at the 2012 London Olympics he was in the British crew that won the bronze medal in the men's eight. He returned to the eight for the 2020 Tokyo games, again winning bronze.

Early life
Sbihi was born in Kingston upon Thames to a British mother and a Moroccan father. He attended Hollyfield Secondary School in Surbiton, before studying Sport Science with Health, Nutrition & Exercise at St. Mary's University College, Twickenham on a sports scholarship from 2006 to 2010. Before he joined the rowing team he played both association football and basketball. 

At the age of 15, he was identified as a potentially successful oarsman by a talent-spotting programme and joined the GB Rowing World Class Start programme. Sbihi finished first in the junior men J15 category at the 2003 Great Britain Indoor Rowing Championships.

Career
At the 2012 Summer Olympics in London, United Kingdom he was part of the British crew that won the bronze medal in the eight.

In 2013, he was part of the men’s eight that won gold at the World Rowing Championships.  In 2014 he won gold medals in the coxless four at both the European Rowing Championships in Belgrade and the World Championships in Amsterdam. In 2015, he won gold at the World Championships for the third consecutive year, this time in the eight again.

In the 2016 Rio Olympics, Sbihi was part of the GB coxless four. The team won the gold medal, Britain's fifth consecutive gold in the event. 

He won a bronze medal at the 2017 World Rowing Championships in Sarasota, Florida, as part of the coxless four. He then won a bronze medal at the 2018 World Rowing Championships in Plovdiv, Bulgaria, as part of the eight with James Rudkin, Alan Sinclair, Tom Ransley, Thomas George, Oliver Wynne-Griffith, Matthew Tarrant, Will Satch and Henry Fieldman and won another bronze medal the following year at the 2019 World Rowing Championships in Ottensheim, Austria as part of the eight with George, Rudkin, Josh Bugajski, Jacob Dawson, Wynne-Griffith, Tarrant, Thomas Ford and Fieldman.

In 2021, he won a European gold medal in the eight in Varese, Italy.

Sbihi was selected as one of Team GB's two flag bearers for the 2020 Tokyo Summer Olympic Games Opening Ceremony, on 23 July 2021, which he described as a "huge honour". He became Great Britain's first ever Muslim flag bearer.

Honours
Sbihi was made a member of the Order of the British Empire (MBE) in the Queen's 2017 New Year Honours list for services to rowing.

References

External links

1988 births
Living people
English male rowers
People from Kingston upon Thames
Rowers at the 2012 Summer Olympics
Rowers at the 2016 Summer Olympics
Rowers at the 2020 Summer Olympics
Olympic rowers of Great Britain
Olympic gold medallists for Great Britain
Olympic bronze medallists for Great Britain
Olympic medalists in rowing
English Muslims
English people of Moroccan descent
Medalists at the 2012 Summer Olympics
Medalists at the 2016 Summer Olympics
Medalists at the 2020 Summer Olympics
Rowers from Greater London
British male rowers
World Rowing Championships medalists for Great Britain
Members of the Order of the British Empire